This article details Car Nos. 14–18 of the Manx Electric Railway on the Isle of Man.

The fourth batch of power cars delivered to the railway in 1898 were also the first open toastracks delivered.  Five of these crossbench 56-seat cars were supplied by G.F. Milnes & Co., in 1898 and all of these survive today, with only two in semi-regular service, being cars 16, which carries the "nationalisation green" livery that was adopted for a brief time to selected cars from 1957 and car 18 which retains traditional company livery although, different from other open cars, the valences are white trimmed with red.  All other open cars have red valences, trimmed white.  The rest of the class remain in various states of disrepair having not been used for a number of years, latterly at the Homefield bus depot, their long-term futures uncertain, especially as two class members have been retained in serviceable condition.

References

Sources
 Manx Manx Electric Railway Fleetlist (2002) Manx Electric Railway Society
 Island Island Images: Manx Electric Railway Pages (2003) Jon Wornham
 Official Official Tourist Department Page (2009) Isle Of Man Heritage Railways

Manx Electric Railway